Paolo Daniel Cardozo (born June 9, 1989) is an Uruguayan footballer who currently plays for Olympians FC in the United Premier Soccer League.

Career

Argentina
Cardozo started his career with the youth ranks of Argentine power Club Atlético River Plate. After impressing while at River, Cardozo moved to the reserve side of Quilmes. While with Quilmes, Cardozo quickly established himself as one of the top scorers in the highly successful Quilmes reserve side. As a result, he was signed to a full professional contract by Quilmes in June 2010. On January 31, 2010 Cardozo debuted for the senior side in a match against Boca Unidos.

United States
During the 2010 season Cardozo went on trial with Columbus Crew. In January 2011, after receiving limited first team action with Quilmes, Cardozo signed with Major League Soccer with hopes of being selected in the 2011 MLS SuperDraft. On January 13, he was selected by the Los Angeles Galaxy with the #16 pick of the first round of the MLS SuperDraft.

He made his debut for Galaxy on March 20, 2011, in a game against New England Revolution.

On April 10, 2012 Cardozo was traded to Chivas USA in exchange for David Lopes. Chivas USA released Cardozo on February 14, 2013.

Cardozo was named United Premier Soccer League 2017 Spring Season MVP on August 4, 2017. He tallied 14 goals and 18 assists to help the LA Wolves to their first UPSL Championship.

Cardozo transferred from Wolves to fellow UPSL side OC Invicta FC for the 2017 Fall Season. He was named national player of the week with Invicta on September 25, 2017.

In 2019, Cardozo played with LA 10 FC of the UPSL.

Following a 2020 stint in the National Independent Soccer Association with Los Angeles Force, Cardozo returned to the UPSL to play with Arizona club Olympians FC. Cardozo scored 7 times for Olympians during the 2022 Fall Season.

Honours

Los Angeles Galaxy
MLS Cup (1): 2011
Major League Soccer Supporters' Shield (1): 2011
Major League Soccer Western Conference Championship (1): 2011

California United FC II
United Premier Soccer League 2017 Spring Season Most Valuable Player (MVP) & member of the 2017 Fall & Spring UPSL National Championship teams.

References

External links
 
 NISA stats

1989 births
Living people
Footballers from Montevideo
Uruguayan expatriate footballers
Uruguayan expatriate sportspeople in Argentina
Uruguayan footballers
Association football midfielders
Quilmes Atlético Club footballers
LA Galaxy players
Chivas USA players
C.S. Cartaginés players
LA Laguna FC players
Expatriate footballers in Argentina
Expatriate soccer players in the United States
Expatriate footballers in Costa Rica
Major League Soccer players
USL League Two players
LA Galaxy draft picks
United Premier Soccer League players